Pat Kirwan is a former American football coach. He began his NFL career in 1972 after coaching high school and college football. 

He was an area scout for the Phoenix Cardinals (1989) and Tampa Bay Buccaneers (1983–86). He spent eight years (1989–97) with the New York Jets, beginning as a defensive assistant coach and advancing to director of player administration, where he negotiated contracts and managed the team's salary cap. 

Kirwan, a graduate of St. Anthony's High School, was offensive coordinator for Hofstra University and head coach of Maria Regina High School. 

Following his NFL career, he became a regular contributor to CNNSI and is an NFL.com senior analyst. He currently co-hosts on SiriusXM NFL Radio's Movin' the Chains with Jim Miller. He is the author of Take Your Eye Off the Ball: How to Watch Football by Knowing Where to Look (2010), along with David Seigerman.

In the 2017 video game Madden NFL 18 story mode Longshot, Kirwan and Jim Miller co-host a fictional show called Real Football.

References

External links

 Pat Kirwan profile at CNNSI 

Year of birth missing (living people)
Place of birth missing (living people)
Living people
Arizona Cardinals scouts
Tampa Bay Buccaneers scouts
New York Jets coaches
New York Jets executives
Manhattan College alumni
Sportspeople from New York (state)